Cerithiopsis lata is a species of sea snail, a gastropod in the family Cerithiopsidae, which is known from the Caribbean Sea and the Gulf of Mexico. It was originally described by C.B. Adams in 1850.

Description 
The maximum recorded shell length is 3.3 mm.

Habitat 
Minimum recorded depth is 0 m. Maximum recorded depth is 44 m.

References

lata
Gastropods described in 1850